Sant'Agata sui Due Golfi is an Italian village, the major hamlet (frazione) of the municipality of Massa Lubrense in the Province of Naples, Campania region. It is part of the Sorrentine Peninsula and its population is around 3,000.

History
The first inhabitants were Greek settlers that built a Necropolis in a place now called "Deserto".

Geography
The name suffix sui due golfi (Italian for "upon two gulfs") is referred to the location of Sant'Agata, that lies on a hill between the gulfs of Naples and Salerno. Near its territory, on the coast, is located the natural fjord of Crapolla.

Its main road (SS 145, directly linked to the Amalfi Drive) links Sorrento (6 km far) and Massa Lubrense (4,5 km) with Positano (17 km) and the rest of the Amalfi Coast. Sant'Agata is 24 km far from Castellammare di Stabia, 32 from Amalfi, 57 from Naples and 63 from Salerno.

See also
Crapolla
Sirenuse
Amalfi Coast
Sorrentine Peninsula

References

External links

 Sant'Agata sui Due Golfi website
Map of Sant'Agata sui Due Golfi

Frazioni of the Province of Naples
Populated coastal places in Italy